While Black with MK Asante is a docuseries from Snapchat. The show is a Snap Original and is produced by Snapchat, NBCUniversal, Indigo Development and Entertainment Arts, and Main Event Media. It is hosted by MK Asante. The first episode of the series aired November 4, 2019.

Vibe (magazine) writes that While Black with MK Asante "explores what it means to be young, gifted and black through the lens of several young men and women who are making a radical change within themselves and their communities."
BET writes of While Black with MK Asante that "By concentrating on matters most relevant to people of color right now, the Snapchat series explores everything from criminalizing children to Black Lives Matter to the N-word."

Concept
While Black with MK Asante takes the stories of America’s black youth and gives them a platform in the smartphones of millions of America’s teens.

Reach and reception 
While Black with MK Asante was listed in People magazine's list: "The Short-Form Shows We’re Most Excited for in 2020."

NBC anchor Craig Melvin discussed While Black with MK Asante on The Today Show, remarking "What I love about the show and what he's doing. One of my chief complaints about these things [smartphones] is that it's created an entire generation of news grazers; people who just read the headlines. But what he does in his Snapchat show is takes difficult topics to get your head around, and he digs into them, and covers all the angles."

The show is in its 2nd season and has 499k subscribers on Snapchat.

Awards 
2021 Best use of Snapchat Discover (Finalist) - Shorty Awards
2020 Short Form Series (Nomination) Critics' Choice Real TV Awards
2020 Best in Social Activism (Finalist) - Shorty Awards

See also
 Driving while black
 Dying While Black
 Shopping while black

References

External links 
 Snap Originals - While Black with MK Asante

Snap Inc.
2016 American television series debuts
2010s American television news shows
2020s American television news shows
2010s American documentary television series
2020s American documentary television series